Buckner station is a DART light rail station located in southeast Dallas, Texas for service on the . The station opened as part of the Green Line's expansion in December 2010. Buckner Station serves as the southern terminus of the Green Line.  It is located in southeast Dallas at the intersection of Elam Road and Buckner Boulevard in the vicinity of the Pleasant Grove neighborhood.

References

External links 
Dallas Area Rapid Transit - Buckner Station

Dallas Area Rapid Transit light rail stations in Dallas
Railway stations in the United States opened in 2010
Railway stations in Dallas County, Texas